William Levi Dawson (April 26, 1886 – November 9, 1970) was an American politician and lawyer who represented a Chicago, Illinois district for more than 27 years in the United States House of Representatives, serving from 1943 to his death in office in 1970. In 1949, he became the first African American to chair a congressional committee.

Born in segregated Georgia, Dawson attended Fisk University in Tennessee and Northwestern University School of Law in Chicago.  He served as an officer in the segregated U.S. Army in World War I. Back in Chicago, he became a successful lawyer and community leader.

Like his two predecessors representing Illinois' 1st District, when Dawson was first elected in 1942, he was the only African American in Congress. He was active in the civil rights movement and sponsored registration drives. In the late 1940s he successfully opposed efforts to re-segregate the military.

Dawson was the first African American to chair a committee in the United States Congress, when he chaired the Committee on Expenditures in the Executive Departments. He served as chair of that committee and its successor for most of the years between 1949 and 1970. After 1952, Dawson also became closely aligned with the Democratic city machine in Chicago, collaborating often with Mayor Richard J. Daley.  In this role, he focused on patronage and services for his constituents. He gave no support to the efforts of Martin Luther King Jr. to shake up city politics in the late 1960s.

Early life and education
Dawson was born in Albany, Georgia in 1886. He attended the local public segregated school and graduated from Albany Normal School in 1905, which prepared teachers for lower schools.  He continued his studies at Fisk University, a historically black college in Nashville, Tennessee, where he graduated magna cum laude in 1909.

He moved to the Chicago area in Illinois in 1912 to study at Northwestern University Law School. He was initiated into Alpha Phi Alpha fraternity, the first fraternity founded by and for African Americans, at Theta Chapter. He reached Chicago at the beginning of the Great Migration of hundreds of thousands of African Americans from rural areas of the South to industrial cities in the North and Midwest - more than 1.5 million migrated up to 1940, and millions more after that.

Career
With the entry of the U.S. into World War I, Dawson served in France as a first lieutenant with the 366th Infantry Regiment of the United States Army from 1917 until 1919. After returning home, he was admitted to the bar in 1920 and started a private practice in Chicago.

Dawson entered politics, becoming a member of the Republican Party in 1930 as a state central committeeman for the First Congressional District of Illinois. He held this position until 1932. That year he was elected as an alderman for the second ward of Chicago, serving from 1933 until 1939. After that, he served as a Democratic Party committeeman.

Dawson was elected in 1942 as a Democratic Representative from Illinois to the Seventy-eighth, and to the thirteen succeeding Congresses, serving from January 3, 1943, until his death from pneumonia in Chicago, Illinois in 1970. In addition to influencing national policy, he acted as a mentor for rising young black politicians in Chicago, such as Archibald Carey Jr., helping with their elections and federal appointments.

During his tenure in the House, Dawson was a vocal opponent of the poll tax, which in practice was discriminatory against poorer voters.  Since the end of the nineteenth century, poll taxes were among a variety of measures passed by southern states to disfranchise most black voters and tens of thousands of poor whites as well, particularly in Alabama through the 1940s.

Dawson is credited with defeating the Winstead Amendment.  Proposed by Representative William Winstead (D-Mississippi) after the Truman administration integrated the United States armed forces following World War II, it would have allowed military members to opt out of racially integrated units.

In 1952, Dawson was the featured speaker at the first annual conference of the Regional Council of Negro Leadership (a civil rights organization), held in the all-black town of Mound Bayou, Mississippi. He was invited by Dr. T.R.M. Howard, who headed the RCNL. Dawson was the first black congressman to speak in the state since Reconstruction ended in 1877.

Dawson, a member of the Democratic National Committee (DNC), had the long-term goal of increasing national black support for the party. Since the Civil War, most blacks had been allied with the Republican Party, as it had emancipated the slaves and led the movement for amendments to grant them citizenship and the franchise. T.R.M. Howard, who had moved to Chicago, challenged Dawson as a Republican opponent in the 1958 election, but Dawson won and kept his seat.

Dawson was the first African American to serve as the chairman of a regular congressional committee beginning in 1949, leading the Committee on Expenditures in the Executive Departments in the Eighty-first and Eighty-second Congresses.  He chaired its successor, the Committee on Government Operations, in the Eighty-fourth through Ninety-first Congresses. For years he and Adam Clayton Powell Jr. from Harlem, New York, were the only two African-American representatives in Congress.

Dawson was also leader of the African-American "submachine" within the Cook County Democratic Organization. In the predominantly African-American wards, Dawson acted as his own political boss, handing out patronage and punishing rivals just as leaders of the larger machine did, such as Richard J. Daley.  However, Dawson's machine had to continually support the regular machine in order to retain its own clout. He chose to work on city politics from this stance, rather than to conduct open civil rights challenges, and did not support the work of Dr. Martin Luther King Jr. in Chicago in the 1960s. Dawson undercut the nascent efforts of the Chicago Housing Authority in the early 1950s to integrate Black residents into white neighborhoods because those neighborhoods were outside Dawson's district and, hence, not votes he could deliver to the machine.

Dawson advised 1960 presidential candidate John F. Kennedy not to "use the phrase 'civil rights' in his speeches, because it might hurt the feelings of Dawson's Southern friends in Congress -- friends who had given Dawson control over many jobs in federal agencies." President Kennedy offered Dawson the position of United States Postmaster General as a reward for his work on Kennedy's 1960 election campaign. Dawson declined, as he believed that he could accomplish more in the House.

Dawson died of pneumonia in Chicago on November 9, 1970. He was cremated, and his ashes were placed in the columbarium in the Griffin Funeral Home in Chicago.

Electoral history

See also
List of African-American United States representatives
List of African American activists
List of United States Congress members who died in office (1950–99)

Notes

References

African American Registry: William L. Dawson, "Windy City" congressman". Note: This source contains some minor factual discrepancies with the Congressional Bioguide; the Bioguide has been treated as authoritative when in conflict.

Further reading
Manning, Christopher. William L. Dawson and the Limits of Black Electoral Leadership. DeKalb, IL: Northern Illinois University Press, 2009
"William Levi Dawson", in Black Americans in Congress, 1870-2007, Office of History & Preservation, U. S. House of Representatives. Washington: Government Printing Office, 2008.
Vaz, Matthew Running the Numbers: Race, Police, and the History of Urban Gambling University of Chicago, Chicago, Illinois 2020

|-

|-

1886 births
1970 deaths
20th-century American politicians
African-American members of the United States House of Representatives
African-American people in Illinois politics
United States Army personnel of World War I
Chicago City Council members
Chicago-Kent College of Law alumni
Deaths from pneumonia in Illinois
Democratic Party members of the United States House of Representatives from Illinois
Fisk University alumni
Illinois lawyers
Illinois Republicans
Infectious disease deaths in Illinois
Northwestern University Pritzker School of Law alumni
People from Albany, Georgia
United States Army officers
20th-century American lawyers
20th-century African-American politicians
African Americans in World War I
Military personnel from Illinois
African-American United States Army personnel
African-American men in politics